Shaarib Sabri (born 29 December 1988) is a singer from Jaipur, Rajasthan, India.

Personal life 
Shaarib Sabri was born in Delhi, India but later moved to Durga Marg, Moti Nagar, Jaipur in Rajasthan. Sabri's father is a classical Indian musician. Other singers in his family include his older brother Toshi Sabri, who was a contestant in the STAR Plus singing competition, Amul STAR Voice of India.

Career
Sabri left in the middle of his 11th grade education to focus on a musical career. He was a finalist on Sa Re Ga Ma Pa Challenge 2005 achieving 10th place by public votes and subsequently a runner-up with Banjyotsna Borgohain in Sa Re Ga Ma Pa Ek Main Aur Ek Tu. Sabri was a contestant on the show Junoon – Kuch Kar Dikhayenge on NDTV in the Bollywood Filmi Group. He has sung for movies like Raaz - The Mystery Continues in the rock version of "Maahi (Rock With Me)" with his brother Toshi Sabri. He was the music director for the Raaz – The Mystery Continues with his brother. Besides that, Shaarib has sung a song in the movie Summer of 2007. Sabri was a participant on the show Music Ka Maha Muqqabla on STAR Plus.

Discography

As Singer

As a Music Director with Toshi Sabri

References

External links
 

1988 births
Living people
Indian Muslims
Musicians from Jaipur
Sa Re Ga Ma Pa participants
Indian male playback singers
Singers from Rajasthan
21st-century Indian singers
21st-century Indian male singers
Chishti-Sabiris